Expecting Love is a 2008 Polish/American film directed by Łukasz Karwowski and written by Łukasz Karwowski and Kas Graham, starring Joshua Leonard, Agnieszka Grochowska, Robert Forster, Michael Dunn, Mikolaj Grabowski and Agnieszka Pilaszewska.

Plot 
Ian (Joshua Leonard) is a successful American lawyer and rising star in a Los Angeles firm run by George Patten (Robert Forster). Ian's life is upended when he discovers a fling he had with Joanna (Agnieszka Grochowska), a Polish woman, has resulted in a pregnancy. With his career on the line, Ian heads to Warsaw in an attempt to talk Joanna out of keeping the baby, but what he discovers on the other side of the world leads to unexpected twists and turns, forcing to him to confront his priorities in life and love.

Release 
The film was released in Poland theatrically on March 23, 2008.

Cast 

 Joshua Leonard as Ian
 Agnieszka Grochowska as Joanna Malczyk
 Mikolaj Grabowski as Bogdan
 Agnieszka Pilaszewska as Aldona
 Marcin Bosak as Marcel
 Michael Dunn as Steve
 Robert Forster as Agent Stenson
 Liz Torres as Juanita
 Lukasz Simlat as Zbyszek
 Anna Guzik as Marianna
 Cathy Doe as Chloe
 Maciej Kowalewski as Policeman 1
 Maciej Wierzbicki as Policeman 2
 Agnieszka Wielgosz as Prostitute
 Sean Smith as SEC Agent #1
 Wil Bowers as SEC Agent #2
 Marcin Perchuc as Doctor
 Sara Erikson as Kelly
 Redbad Klynstra as Dumplings bar owner
 Michal Zurawski as Hotel security
 David Groh as Used Car Dealer
 Agata Kulesza as Doctor

References

External links
 

2008 films
Polish independent films
American independent films
2008 independent films
2000s American films